The Furman Paladins college football team represents the Furman University in the Southern Conference. The Paladins compete as part of the NCAA Division I Football Championship Subdivision. The program has had 23 head coaches since it began play during the 1889 season. Since December 2016, Clay Hendrix has served as head coach at Furman.

Six coaches have led Northwestern in postseason appearances: Dick Sheridan, Jimmy Satterfield, Bobby Johnson, Bobby Lamb, Bruce Fowler, and Hendrix. Eight of those coaches also won conference championships: Billy Laval captured three and Dizzy McLeod captured one as a member of the Southern Intercollegiate Athletic Association; and Sheridan captured six, Satterfield three, Johnson two, and Lamb and Fowler one each as a member of the Southern Conference.

Bob King is the leader in overall seasons coached with his 15 years as head coach. Laval has the most all time wins with 80 and H. C. Granger has the highest winning percentage at 1.000. William Beattie has the lowest winning percentage at 0.000. Of the 23 different head coaches who have led the Paladins, Dick Sheridan has been inducted into the College Football Hall of Fame.

Key

Coaches

Notes

References

Furman

Furman Paladins head football coaches